Francesca Marinaro, is an Italian politician. From 1984–1989 she served as a Member of the European Parliament, representing Italy for the Communist Party

References

1952 births
Living people
People from Villarosa
Italian Communist Party MEPs
MEPs for Italy 1984–1989
20th-century women MEPs for Italy
Politicians from the Province of Enna